Sebastian Vinther Jørgensen (born 8 June 2000) is a Danish professional footballer who plays as a right winger for Danish Superliga club Silkeborg IF.

References

Living people
2000 births
People from Silkeborg
Sportspeople from the Central Denmark Region
Danish men's footballers
Association football midfielders
Denmark under-21 international footballers
Danish Superliga players
Danish 1st Division players
Silkeborg IF players